Richard Young (13 July 1939 – 1988) was an English professional footballer who played as a forward.

References

1939 births
1988 deaths
People from the Metropolitan Borough of Gateshead
Footballers from Tyne and Wear
English footballers
Association football forwards
Usworth Juniors F.C. players
Newcastle United F.C. players
South Shields F.C. (1936) players
Grimsby Town F.C. players
Stockport County F.C. players
Ellesmere Port Town F.C. players
Macclesfield Town F.C. players
English Football League players